The Bishop of Stafford is an episcopal title used by a suffragan bishop of the Church of England Diocese of Lichfield, in the Province of Canterbury, England. The title takes its name after Stafford, the county town of Staffordshire. The Bishop of Stafford has particular episcopal oversight of the parishes in the Archdeaconry of Stoke. Matthew Parker has been in post since 2021; the bishops suffragan of Stafford have been area bishops since the Lichfield area scheme was erected in 1992.

List of bishops

Incarnation at Alton Towers
The Alton Towers Dungeon is an attraction at the Theme Park Alton Towers that replaced the former ‘Charlie and the Chocolate Factory the ride’ in 2019. It is one of many Dungeon attractions in the UK that are part of the Merlin Entertainments. 
After an encounter with the Warden of the Dungeon, visitors enter into the Court Room of the Bishop of Stafford who has been appointed by Elizabeth I as justice of the peace for the shire. The Bishop says:’To my flock of lambs, I shall be both shepherd and butcher!’ Several visitors are put on trial for various crimes for everyone being sentenced to journey down the black river!

References

External links
 Crockford's Clerical Directory - Listings

Bishops of Stafford
Anglican suffragan bishops in the Diocese of Lichfield